The Nudariina are a subtribe of lichen moths in the family Erebidae. The taxon was described by Carl Julius Bernhard Börner in 1920.

Taxonomy
The subtribe used to be classified as the tribe Nudariini of the subfamily Lithosiinae of the family Arctiidae.

Genera
The following genera are included in the subtribe.  

Acco
Afrasura
Arctelene
Asparus
Asura
Asuridia
Asuroides
Barsine
Boadicea
Byrsia
Caprimimodes
Caulocera
Celamodes
Chamaita
Chiretolpis
Chrysallactis
Chrysasura
Chrysomesia
Crocodeta
Cyana
Cyclomilta
Cyme
Damias
Darantasia
Darantoides
Diaconisia
Diduga
Emelieana
Eriomastyx
Eucyclopera
Eugoa
Eurosia
Eutane
Garudinodes
Graptasura
Gymnasura
Heliosia
Hemonia
Heterallactis
Holocraspedon
Lambulosia
Licnoptera
Lobobasis
Lyclene
Macaduma
Macadumosia
Melanaema
Meteugoa
Micronyctemera
Miltochrista
Narosodes
Neasura
Neoscaptia
Notata
Nudaria
Ocrosia
Opsaroa
Padenia
Padenodes
Paidia
Palaeotype
Palaeugoa
Paradohertya
Parafrasura
Parascaptia
Paurophleps
Phacusosia
Phlogomera
Planovalvata
Prosiccia
Scaptesyle
Schalodeta
Schistophleps
Siccia
Stenoscaptia
Stictane
Stictosia
Thermograpta
Thumatha
Trichocerosia
Trischalis
Utriculofera
Xanthetis
Zygaenosia

References 

 
Lepidoptera subtribes